The Roman Catholic Archdiocese of Halifax-Yarmouth is a Roman Catholic archdiocese that includes part of the civil province of Nova Scotia.

The archdiocese has both a cathedral, St. Mary's Cathedral Basilica, in Halifax, and a co-cathedral St. Ambrose Co-Cathedral, in Yarmouth. Its current diocesan ordinary is Archbishop Brian Dunn.

History 
On territory originally a part of the Diocese of Quebec, including the whole of Nova Scotia, the future diocese of Halifax was established on 4 September 1817 as the Apostolic Vicariate of Nova Scotia, a pre-diocesan jurisdiction entitled to a titular bishop and exempt, i.e., directly subject to the Holy See, not part of any ecclesiastical province.

It was promoted to a bishopric on 15 February 1842 and on 22 September 1844 lost territory to establish the Roman Catholic Diocese of Arichat, now (as the Diocese of Antigonish) one of its suffragans.

In 1852, Halifax was elevated to an archdiocese.

It lost territory twice more: on 19 February 1953 to establish the Apostolic Prefecture of Bermuda Islands and on 6 July 1953 to establish the Roman Catholic Diocese of Yarmouth.

It enjoyed a papal visit from Pope John Paul II in September 1984.

In December 2011, the Diocese of Yarmouth was merged back into the Archdiocese of Halifax, creating the Archdiocese of Halifax-Yarmouth, which was renamed by absorbing its title. The former cathedral became the St. Ambrose Co-Cathedral, in Yarmouth, Nova Scotia.

Extent and province 
The Archdiocese of Halifax-Yarmouth covers 34,055 square kilometers. As of 2021, the archdiocese contained 66 parishes, 58 active diocesan priests, 7 religious priests, and 215,880 Catholics.  It also had 87 women religious, 7 religious brothers, and 41 permanent deacons.

The metropolitan archbishop heads an ecclesiastical province which includes the suffragan dioceses of Antigonish and Charlottetown.

Bishops 
(all Roman Rite)
 Apostolic Vicars of Nova Scotia
 Edmund Burke (1817.07.04 – 1820.11.29), Titular Bishop of Sion (1817.07.04 – 1820.11.29)
 Denis Lyons (1824.08.24 – 1824.10.19 not possessed), Titular Bishop of Tanis (1824.08.24 – 1824.10.19 not possessed)
 William Fraser (1825.06.03 – 1842.02.15 see below), Titular Bishop of Tanis (1825.06.03 – 1842.02.15)

 Suffragan Bishops of Halifax
William Fraser (1842.02.15 – 1844.09.27), later Bishop of Arichat (Canada) (1844.09.27 – 1851.10.04)
William Walsh (1844.09.21 – 1852.05.04), previously Titular Bishop of Maximianopolis (1842.02.15 – 1844.09.21) & Coadjutor Bishop of Halifax (Canada) (1842.02.15 – 1844.09.21 see below); promoted the first Metropolitan Archbishop of Halifax (Canada) (1852.05.04 – 1858.08.10)

 Metropolitan Archbishops of Halifax
 William Walsh ( see above 1852.05.04 – death 1858.08.10)
Thomas Louis Connolly, Friars Minor (O.F.M.) (1859.04.08 – death 1876.07.27), previously Bishop of Saint John in America (Canada) (1852.05.04 – 1859.04.08)
Michael Hannan (1877.02.16 – death 1882.04.17)
Cornelius O'Brien (1882.12.01 – death 1906.03.09)
Edward Joseph McCarthy (1906.06.27 – death 1931.01.26)
Thomas O'Donnell (1931.01.26 – death 1936.01.13), previously Bishop of Victoria (Canada) (1923.12.23 – 1929.05.27), Titular Archbishop of Methymna (1929.05.27 – 1931.01.26), Coadjutor Archbishop of Halifax (Canada) (1929.05.27 – 1931.01.26)
John Thomas McNally (1937.02.17 – death 1952.11.18), previously Bishop of Calgary (Canada) (1913.04.04 – 1924.08.12), Bishop of Hamilton (Canada) (1924.08.12 – 1937.02.17)
Joseph Gerald Berry (1953.11.28 – 1967.05.12), President of the  Canadian Conference of Catholic Bishops (1960 – 1964); previously Bishop of Peterborough (Canada) (1945.04.07 – 1953.11.28)
James Hayes (1967.06.22 – 1990.11.06), President of the Canadian Conference of Catholic Bishops (1987 – 1989); previously Titular Bishop of Reperi (1965.02.05 – 1967.06.22) & Auxiliary Bishop of Halifax (1965.02.05 – 1967.06.22)
Austin-Emile Burke (1991.07.08 – 1998.01.13), previously Bishop of Yarmouth (Canada) (1968.02.01 – 1991.07.08)
Terrence Prendergast, Jesuits (S.J.) (1998.06.30 – 2007.05.14), previously Titular Bishop of Sléibhte (1995.02.22 – 1998.06.30) & Auxiliary Bishop of Toronto (Canada) (1995.02.22 – 1998.06.30); also Apostolic Administrator of Yarmouth (Canada) (2002.01.24 – 2007.05.14); later Metropolitan Archbishop of Ottawa (Canada) (2007.05.14 – ...)
Apostolic Administrator Claude Champagne, Missionary Oblates of Mary Immaculate (O.M.I.) (2007.07.13 – 2007.10.18)
Anthony Mancini (2007.10.18 – 2009.10.22 see below), also Apostolic Administrator of Yarmouth (Canada) (2007.10.18 – 2009.10.22), Apostolic Administrator of Antigonish (Canada) (2009.09.26 – 2009.11.21) ; previously Titular Bishop of Natchitoches (1999.02.18 – 2007.10.18) & Auxiliary Bishop of Montréal (Canada) (1999.02.18 – 2007.10.18)

 Metropolitan Archbishops of Halifax-Yarmouth
 Anthony Mancini (see above 2009.10.22 – 2020.11.27)
 Brian Joseph Dunn (2020.11.27 - ...)

Coadjutor bishops
 Thomas Maguire (1819), as Coadjutor Vicar Apostolic: did not take effect
 William Walsh (1842-1844)
 Thomas O'Donnell (1929-1931)
Brian Joseph Dunn (2019-20)

 Other priests of this diocese who became bishops
 Colin Campbell, appointed Bishop of Antigonish, Nova Scotia in 1986
 Martin William Currie, appointed Bishop of Grand Falls, Newfoundland in 2000
 Richard William Smith, appointed Bishop of Pembroke, Ontario in 2002

References

Sources and external links 
 
 GigaCatholic, with incumbent biography links
 

 
Culture of Nova Scotia
Catholic Church in Nova Scotia
Colchester County
Cumberland County, Nova Scotia
Halifax County, Nova Scotia
Hants County, Nova Scotia
Lunenburg County, Nova Scotia
Queens County, Nova Scotia